Vladyslav Anatoliyovych Atroshenko (born 5 December 1968) is a Ukrainian politician who is currently serving as the mayor of Chernihiv since 2015.

In the 2015 Ukrainian local elections, he was elected for the Petro Poroshenko Bloc "Solidarity".

Biography
Atroshenko is a former Ukrainian MP, last serving from November 2014 to January 2016. He was elected in the 2014 Ukrainian parliamentary election on a ticket from the Petro Poroshenko Bloc (as a non-partisan) in single-member constituency 206 (located in Chernihiv, he won the constituency with 51.34% of the votes). In the 2012 Ukrainian parliamentary election Atroshenko was elected in the same constituency as a self-nominated candidate (with 40.64% of the votes). In parliament he joined the Party of Regions faction. In the 2002 Ukrainian parliamentary election he was elected in single-member constituency 207 for Viktor Yushchenko's Our Ukraine Bloc. In 2006, he unsuccessfully ran for parliament on the electoral lists of the Our Ukraine Bloc.

Atroshenko voted for dictatorial laws on January 16, 2014.

On 4 February 2005, Atroshenko was appointed Governor of Chernihiv Oblast, and on December 12 of the same year he was dismissed. In the 2010 Ukrainian local elections, Atroshenko  was elected a deputy of the Chernihiv Oblast Council for the Strong Ukraine party.

In February 2022, during the Siege of Chernihiv, he organized the resistance to the Russian attack on the city. On 2 March, he predicted that urban warfare in the city was possible. Two missiles hit a hospital in the city during the day, according to the health administration chief, Serhiy Pivovar.

On 10 March, he said that Russian forces had completely encircled Chernihiv, adding that the city was completely isolated and that critical infrastructure for its 300,000 residents was rapidly failing as it came under repeated bombardment.

On March 25, 2022, he shot a video from his car showing the destruction of Chernihiv, and on March 26, he reported that more houses were destroyed than intact.

On December 16, 2022, it became known that he wrote a statement to the SBU and the police. Atroshchenko believes that he is constantly being watched. Prior to that, the Yavoriv District Court of the Lviv Region removed the mayor of Chernihiv from his post because at the beginning of the war, he took his family out of shelling in an official car. The "Chesno" movement, the Association of Cities of Ukraine, the Committee of Voters of Ukraine, lawyers and other experts called it political pressure on mayors and an attack on local self-government.

See also
 List of mayors of Chernihiv
 Governor of Chernihiv Oblast
 European Solidarity
 Our Ukraine–People's Self-Defense Bloc
 Strong Ukraine
 Siege of Chernihiv
 Chernihiv

References

External links 
 
 Vladyslav Atroshenko at the Official Ukraine Today portal

1968 births
Living people
People from Chernihiv
Our Ukraine (political party) politicians
Party of Regions politicians
Petro Poroshenko Bloc politicians
Strong Ukraine politicians
Governors of Chernihiv Oblast
Fourth convocation members of the Verkhovna Rada
Seventh convocation members of the Verkhovna Rada
Eighth convocation members of the Verkhovna Rada
Mayors of places in Ukraine